Burchfield is a surname. Notable people with the surname include:

Charles E. Burchfield (1893–1967), American watercolor painter, born in Ashtabula Harbor, Ohio
Martha Burchfield (1924–1977), American watercolor painter, born in Buffalo, New York
Robert Burchfield CNZM CBE (1923–2004), scholar, writer, and lexicographer

Other uses
Burchfield, West Virginia

See also
Burchfield-Penney Art Center, located on the campus of Buffalo State College, founded in 1966